X (pronounced ten) is the eighth studio album by English rock band Def Leppard, released on 30 July 2002 by Island Records in the US and sister label Mercury worldwide. Much like 1996's Slang, it featured another departure from their signature sound by moving into the pop genre. The album charted at No. 11 on The Billboard 200 and No. 14 on the UK Albums Chart. Most of the album was produced by Pete Woodroffe and the band, with remaining tracks produced by either Marti Frederiksen or Per Aldeheim and Andreas Carlsson.

Background
This is the first Def Leppard album in which drummer Rick Allen actively took part in song-writing. On all of the band's prior albums, he is only credited with helping co-write three tracks. On this album alone, he co-wrote eleven. The album is also the first from the band to include original songs not to be written by any of the members: "Unbelievable" and "Long, Long Way to Go", the latter of which was released as a single.

The album features the Roman numeral 'X', recognising it as their tenth album release, although the album is in fact only their eighth collection of all-new studio material. Their previous two albums prior to X, Retro Active and Vault, were a rerecording of B-sides and rarities and a greatest hits set respectively, although Vault also included a non-album single "When Love & Hate Collide" as well as different versions of the songs "Pour Some Sugar on Me" and "Rocket" to what had appeared on the Hysteria album.

The album X peaked at number 11 on the Billboard 200, but did not sell to the standards of their previous releases and failed to earn any RIAA certifications. With the exception of an abbreviated version of "Now" being performed as part of an acoustic medley during the Rock of Ages Tour in 2012, nothing from this album was performed live by the band since the conclusion of its supporting tour until their Las Vegas residency in 2019.

For a short time after the album was released, Def Leppard's website Defleppard.com featured a free mp3 download of "Perfect Girl," a bonus track and early version of the track "Gravity".

The album was released on vinyl for the first time in 2019 alongside 3 other albums from the 2000s, Yeah! and Songs from the Sparkle Lounge, before being released standalone later the same year.

Reception
X received mixed reviews. Stephen Thomas Erlewine of AllMusic rated the album 2.5 out of 5. While commending the band for not adopting the then-popular nu metal and rap rock sound of the time, Erlewine lamented that the band's pop rock approach meant that "they've left rock behind, turning out a bunch of even-handed adult-pop that is melodic without being tuneful, or memorable for that matter." He concludes that, in some instances on X, "Leppard still shows signs of being a great band -- there's a chorus or a bridge here and there with spark, "You're So Beautiful" and "Everyday" are the kind of sugar-sweet, heavy-pop songs that make this band so irresistible—but the slick production and self-conscious maturity make X a leaden affair, unfortunately."

Conversely, Rob Sheffield of Rolling Stone was more positive, favorably comparing X to Bon Jovi's Crush. Sheffield notes how "since the Lepsters always had catchier beats and craftier tunes than the metal competition, they adapt to global pop with their signature sound intact, and X may be their niftiest since Adrenalize."

Track listing

Personnel

Def Leppard
Rick Allen – drums
Vivian Campbell – guitar, vocals
Phil Collen – guitar, vocals
Joe Elliott – lead vocals
Rick "Sav" Savage – bass guitar, vocals

Additional personnel
Eric Carter – keyboards and drum loops on "Now", "You're So Beautiful" and "Everyday"
Stan Schiller – shredding tele licks on "Gravity"

Production
Producers: Def Leppard, Per Aldeheim, Andreas Carlsson, Pete Woodroffe
Engineers: Stefan Glaumann, Richard Chycki, Ronan McHugh, Liz Sroka, Pete Woodroffe
Mixing: Marti Frederiksen, Ronan McHugh, Pete Woodroffe
Mastering: Tom Coyne
A&R: Simon Collins, Jeff Fenster
Production co-ordination: Leslie Langlo, Sue Tropio
Editing: Brian Paturalski
Vocal producer: Ronan McHugh
Drum technician: Jerry Johnson
String arrangements: David Campbell
Programming: Ronan McHugh, Pete Woodroffe
Photography: Clive Arrowsmith

Charts

Weekly charts

Year-end charts

Singles

References
Footnotes

Other

2002 albums
Def Leppard albums
Albums produced by Marti Frederiksen
Island Records albums
Mercury Records albums
Pop rock albums by English artists